Universal Studios Lot is a television and film studio complex located at 100 Universal City Plaza in Universal City, California, adjacent to the Universal Studios Hollywood theme park. It is the site of Universal Pictures and is owned by Comcast through its wholly owned subsidiary NBCUniversal. The lot officially opened the gates of Universal City on March 15, 1915. The lot began offering its modern studio tour in 1964, which eventually evolved into the Universal Studios Hollywood theme park. Today the Universal Studios Lot is made up of 400 acres, which includes more than 30 sound stages, the Brokaw News Center and 165 other separate structures.

Background
On March 15, 1915, Carl Laemmle opened Universal City Studios on a 230-acre ranch in the San Fernando Valley and called it "Universal City". The site later became known as Universal Studios Lot and Universal City was considered the first self-contained community dedicated to making films.

In 1950, Universal Studios Lot increased its overall size to 400 acres after Universal acquired additional land at the southern border of the studio. Music Corporation of America (MCA Inc.) bought the Universal Studios Lot in 1958. Universal then leased back its property from MCA until MCA and Universal merged in 1962.

Shortly after the MCA–Universal Pictures merger, accountants suggested that a new tour in the studio commissary would increase profits. On July 15, 1964, the modern Universal Studios tour was established to include a series of dressing room walk-throughs, peeks at actual production, and later, staged events. This grew over the years into a full-blown theme park now known as Universal Studios Hollywood.

Over the next decades, numerous television shows and movies were filmed in Universal Studios Lot, notably at the Courthouse Square and Colonial Street sets. This includes Psycho (Paramount Pictures), Back to the Future (Universal Pictures),
The Perfect Storm (Warner Bros.), War of the Worlds (Paramount Pictures/DreamWorks), Desperate Housewives (ABC), and The Good Place (NBC). Today, Universal Studios Lot is one of the largest full-service production facilities. It has continued to modernize and grow with plans to expand by adding additional soundstages and building facilities.

Since 2016, the NBC show American Ninja Warrior has filmed their Los Angeles city qualifiers and finals courses on the lot.

Studio stages

Current studio stages

Former studio stages

Studio Tour
The Studio Tour is a public attraction both as a VIP and at the adjacent Universal Studios Hollywood theme park that offers visitors a behind-the-scenes look at the historic studio lot. The tour first opened in 1915 when Carl Laemmle invited visitors to see the studio in action. The Universal Tour was halted in the late 1920s and revived in 1964. Since then it has evolved through countless iterations, including new tour hosts, movie sets, and experiences.

References

External links
 Universal Studios Lot

Universal Pictures
NBCUniversal
Television studios in the United States
Culture of Hollywood, Los Angeles
Tourist attractions in Los Angeles County, California
1915 establishments in California
Olympic International Broadcast Centres